In mathematics, the bagpipe theorem of  describes the structure of the connected (but possibly non-paracompact) ω-bounded surfaces by showing that they are "bagpipes": the connected sum of a compact "bag" with several "long pipes".

Statement
A space is called ω-bounded if the closure of every countable set is compact. For example, the long line and the closed long ray are ω-bounded but not compact. When restricted to a metric space ω-boundedness is equivalent to compactness.

The bagpipe theorem states that every ω-bounded connected surface is the connected sum of a compact connected surface and a finite number of long pipes.  

The simplest example of a pipe is the product  of the circle  and the long closed ray , which is an increasing union of  copies of the half-open interval , pasted together with the lexicographic ordering. Here,  denotes the first uncountable ordinal number, which is the set of all countable ordinals. There are in fact  different isomorphism classes of long pipes. 

The bagpipe theorem does not describe all surfaces since there are many examples of surfaces that are not ω-bounded, such as the Prüfer manifold.

References

Surfaces
Theorems in topology